Andrew Farrell (born April 2, 1992) is an American professional soccer player who plays as a defender for Major League Soccer club New England Revolution. Born in Louisville, Kentucky, Farrell moved with his family to Peru at the age of five and played in the Esther Grande youth team. He moved back to the United States in 2007 and played for United 1996 before playing college soccer for the Louisville Cardinals. After playing three seasons with the Cardinals, Farrell signed a Generation Adidas contract with Major League Soccer and was selected with the first overall pick in the 2013 MLS SuperDraft by the New England Revolution.

Early life
Farrell was born in Louisville, but was raised in Peru from ages of five to fifteen, where his adoptive parents were Presbyterian missionaries. He played there for the Esther Grande de Bentín (EGB)  Academy and attended Colegio Franklin Delano Roosevelt, The American School of Lima.  He later moved back to Louisville and finished high school at Atherton High School.

Career

College and amateur

Farrell moved to Louisville from Peru before his sophomore year in high school. That year, he began playing for United 1996 FC (based in Louisville), as well as Atherton High School. Near the end of high school, Farrell accepted a soccer scholarship to the University of Louisville.

As a freshman at Louisville, Farrell started five games and appeared in 20 for the Cardinals being only one of two freshmen to break into the starting lineup. As a junior, he started in all 23 games for the Cardinals as a midfielder before moving back as a defender for the final nine games of the season. He was named to the NCAA Division I First-Team All-America and won the Big East Defensive Player of the Year Award after the Cardinals only allowed an average of 0.62 goals per game.

Farrell also spent the 2012 season in the USL Premier Development League with the Bradenton Academics and the River City Rovers.

Professional
On January 3, 2013, Farrell signed a Generation Adidas contract with the MLS, making him eligible for early entry into the 2013 MLS SuperDraft.  Two weeks later, he was drafted first overall in the MLS SuperDraft by the New England Revolution, making him the first ever no. 1 pick in club history.

On March 9, 2013, Farrell made his professional debut in the Revs 1–0 away victory over the Chicago Fire in the club's first game of the 2013 season.  He made 32 appearances for the Revolution during his rookie season.

On August 8, 2021, Farrell set a new club record with 255th career start in a 2-1 win over the Philadelphia Union, passing the previous all-time mark set by Shalrie Joseph. Farrell also holds the club record for minutes played, which was achieved on August 18, 2021 in a 3-2 win over D.C. United.

Career statistics

Club

Honors
New England Revolution
 Supporters' Shield: 2021

Louisville Cardinals
Big East Red Division Champions: 2010, 2012
Big East Tournament Champions: 2010

Individual
NCAA First-Team All-American: 2012
Big East Defensive Player of the Year: 2012
MLS All-Star: 2016

References

External links
 

1992 births
Living people
African-American soccer players
American soccer players
Atherton High School alumni
Louisville Cardinals men's soccer players
IMG Academy Bradenton players
Derby City Rovers players
New England Revolution players
Association football defenders
Major League Soccer first-overall draft picks
Soccer players from Louisville, Kentucky
New England Revolution draft picks
USL League Two players
Major League Soccer players
Major League Soccer All-Stars
American expatriate sportspeople in Peru
All-American men's college soccer players
21st-century African-American sportspeople